Mavai-ye Sofla may refer to:
Mavai-ye Sofla, Kerman
Mavai-ye Sofla, Kermanshah